Alyaksandr Kobets (born 11 June 1981) is a Belarusian former professional footballer.

Honours
BATE Borisov
Belarusian Premier League champion: 2002, 2006
Belarusian Cup winner: 2005–06

Naftan Novopolotsk
Belarusian Cup winner: 2011–12

External links

1981 births
Living people
People from Salihorsk
Belarusian footballers
FC Starye Dorogi players
FC BATE Borisov players
FC Gomel players
FC Vitebsk players
FC Naftan Novopolotsk players
FC Slavia Mozyr players
Association football midfielders
Sportspeople from Minsk Region